Norgran Records was an American jazz record label in Los Angeles founded by Norman Granz in 1953. It became part of Verve Records, which Granz created in 1956. It is the first letters of Granz's full name.

Discography

10 inch LP series

12 inch LP series

References

American record labels
Jazz record labels
American companies established in 1953